Ocyrhoe (Ancient Greek: Ὠκυρόη) or Ocyrrhoe (Ὠκυρρόη) refers to at least five characters in Greek mythology.

 Ocyrrhoe, one of the 3,000 Oceanids, water-nymph daughters of the Titans Oceanus and his sister-spouse Tethys. She was the mother of Phasis by Helios. Ocyrhoe may refer to 'speed and mobility'.
Ocyrhoe, daughter of Chiron and Chariclo. She was transformed into a horse because she told her father Chiron his exact fate. Ocyrhoe revealed that he would forsake his immortality to be spared the agonizing pain of a serpent's poison. For this transgression, Ocyrhoe's ability to speak was taken. One might assume that she turned into a horse because her father was a centaur, and because she had long, auburn hair.
 Ocyrrhoe or Ocyone, a naiad-nymph. She was the mother, by Hippasus, of Hippomedon (a defender of Troy), to whom she gave birth on the banks of River Sangarius. Her son was killed by Neoptolemus.
 Ocyrrhoe or Ocroe, the nymph daughter of the river god Imbrasus and Chesias, a noble maiden. While in Miletus at a festival in honor of Artemis, she caught Apollo's attention and, fleeing from his advances, asked Pompilus, a seafarer and an old friend of her father, to take her home. Pompilus took her on board the ship, but Apollo caught up with them, took the girl and then changed the ship into stone and Pompilus into a fish.
 Ocyrrhoe, a nymph of Mysia, mother of Caicus by Hermes.

Modern references
 52872 Okyrhoe, a centaur (a type minor planet) is named after this figure.

A character in The Mongoliad is named Ocyrhoe .

Notes

References 

 Athenaeus of Naucratis, The Deipnosophists or Banquet of the Learned. London. Henry G. Bohn, York Street, Covent Garden. 1854. Online version at the Perseus Digital Library.
 Athenaeus of Naucratis, Deipnosophistae. Kaibel. In Aedibus B.G. Teubneri. Lipsiae. 1887. Greek text available at the Perseus Digital Library.
 Hesiod, Theogony from The Homeric Hymns and Homerica with an English Translation by Hugh G. Evelyn-White, Cambridge, MA.,Harvard University Press; London, William Heinemann Ltd. 1914. Online version at the Perseus Digital Library. Greek text available from the same website.
 The Homeric Hymns and Homerica with an English Translation by Hugh G. Evelyn-White. Homeric Hymns. Cambridge, MA.,Harvard University Press; London, William Heinemann Ltd. 1914. Online version at the Perseus Digital Library. Greek text available from the same website.
 Kerényi, Carl, The Gods of the Greeks, Thames and Hudson, London, 1951.
Lucius Mestrius Plutarchus, Morals translated from the Greek by several hands. Corrected and revised by. William W. Goodwin, PH. D. Boston. Little, Brown, and Company. Cambridge. Press Of John Wilson and son. 1874. 5. Online version at the Perseus Digital Library.
 Pausanias, Description of Greece with an English Translation by W.H.S. Jones, Litt.D., and H.A. Ormerod, M.A., in 4 Volumes. Cambridge, MA, Harvard University Press; London, William Heinemann Ltd. 1918. . Online version at the Perseus Digital Library
 Pausanias, Graeciae Descriptio. 3 vols. Leipzig, Teubner. 1903.  Greek text available at the Perseus Digital Library.
 Publius Ovidius Naso, Metamorphoses translated by Brookes More (1859-1942). Boston, Cornhill Publishing Co. 1922. Online version at the Perseus Digital Library.
 Publius Ovidius Naso, Metamorphoses. Hugo Magnus. Gotha (Germany). Friedr. Andr. Perthes. 1892. Latin text available at the Perseus Digital Library.
 Quintus Smyrnaeus, The Fall of Troy translated by Way. A. S. Loeb Classical Library Volume 19. London: William Heinemann, 1913. Online version at theio.com
 Quintus Smyrnaeus, The Fall of Troy. Arthur S. Way. London: William Heinemann; New York: G.P. Putnam's Sons. 1913. Greek text available at the Perseus Digital Library.

Oceanids
Metamorphoses into animals in Greek mythology
Greek deities
Horses in mythology
Women of Apollo
Women of Helios
Women of Hermes